Yuriy Mykolayovych Vernydub (born 22 January 1966) is a Ukrainian professional football coach and former player.

Career
Vernydub made his professional debut in the Soviet Second League in 1983 for FC Spartak Zhytomyr.

From June 2009, he was an assistant coach with FC Metalurh Zaporizhzhia. After a spell as an assistant coach with FC Zorya Luhansk he was made interim head coach in November 2011 after Zorya's management dismissed head coach Anatoly Chantsev. He stayed at Zorya until 31 May 2019. After leaving Zorya, he coached Belarusian club Shakhtyor Soligorsk. He was appointed manager of Moldovan National Division club Sheriff Tiraspol on 18 December 2020. He won the 2020–21 Moldovan National Division in his first season at the club. In 2021, he led the team to the 2021–22 UEFA Champions League group stage — the first time a Moldovan club accomplished such a feat.

On 8 June 2022, Sheriff Tiraspol and Vernydub agreed to the mutual termination of his contract as Head Coach of the club.

On 21 June 2022, he become the manager of Kryvbas Kryvyi Rih.

Personal life 
In February 2022, Vernydub left his position of Head Coach of Sheriff Tiraspol to join the Armed Forces of Ukraine in response to Russia's invasion of Ukraine that began on 24 February 2022.

Honours

Player
Zenit Saint Petersburg
Russian Cup: 1998–99

Manager
Shakhtyor Soligorsk
Belarusian Premier League: 2020

Sheriff Tiraspol
Moldovan National Division: 2020–21, 2021–22
Moldovan Cup: 2020–21
 Moldovan Super Cup: Runner-Up 2021

References

1966 births
Living people
Footballers from Zhytomyr
Soviet footballers
Ukrainian footballers
Association football defenders
Ukrainian Premier League players
Russian Premier League players
FC Polissya Zhytomyr players
LVVPU Lviv players
FC Elektrometalurh-NZF Nikopol players
FC Metalurh Zaporizhzhia players
FC Spartak Ivano-Frankivsk players
FC Torpedo Zaporizhzhia players
Chemnitzer FC players
FC Zenit Saint Petersburg players
FC Zenit-2 Saint Petersburg players
Ukrainian football managers
Ukrainian Premier League managers
Moldovan Super Liga managers
FC Metalurh Zaporizhzhia managers
FC Zorya Luhansk managers
FC Shakhtyor Soligorsk managers
FC Sheriff Tiraspol managers
FC Kryvbas Kryvyi Rih managers
Lesgaft National State University of Physical Education, Sport and Health alumni
Ukrainian expatriate footballers
Ukrainian expatriate football managers
Ukrainian expatriate sportspeople in Germany
Expatriate footballers in Germany
Ukrainian expatriate sportspeople in Russia
Expatriate footballers in Russia
Ukrainian expatriate sportspeople in Belarus
Expatriate football managers in Belarus
Ukrainian expatriate sportspeople in Moldova
Expatriate football managers in Moldova
Ukrainian military personnel of the 2022 Russian invasion of Ukraine
Sportspeople from Zhytomyr Oblast